Luke Kibet Bowen (born 12 April 1983) is a Kenyan long-distance runner who specializes in the marathon. He won the marathon race at the 2007 World Championships.

Early career 

Kibet was born in Kaplelach village, Moiben division, Uasin Gishu District. Famed Kenyan runners Samson Kitur and Noah Ngeny come from the same area.

Kibet took up running in 1996, aged 13, impressed by the Kenyan performances at the 1996 Summer Olympics. He went to Moiben Secondary School from 1997 to 2000 and then joined Kenya Prisons Service.

Kibet originally specialized in the steeplechase, his personal best being 8:25.4 minutes. In 2003, he won the Tilburg Ten Miles race in Tilburg, Netherlands. He ran his first half marathon in 2003, finishing fourth in the City-Pier-City Loop in the Hague.

He took up the marathon in 2004 and reached the international level in this event. Kibet entered his first marathon, 2004 Enschede Marathon, as a pacemaker, but finished the race at 2nd position timing 2:11:06. He finished second also at the 2004 Frankfurt Marathon. He also won a 25-km race in Berlin that year.

Kibet won Taipei Marathon in 2005 and 2006. His personal best time is 2:08:52 hours, achieved in October 2005 in Eindhoven where he finished third. In the half marathon his personal best time is 1:00:43 hours, achieved in September 2006 in Rotterdam Half Marathon, where he finished sixth.

World champion 

Kibet won the Vienna Marathon in 2007. He won the gold medal at the 2007 World Championships in Athletics in a time of 2:15:59 hours. It was the first Kenyan marathon victory at the World Championships since Douglas Wakiihuri in 1987. Kibet's win was a surprise given that before the race the Kenyan marathon team was termed by many as the "worst ever assembled".

On October 28, 2007, he won the Great South Run 10-mile race in Portsmouth, England.

Later career 

During the 2007–08 riots in Kenya, Kibet was attacked by a mob and hurt heavily by a stone, which hit his head.

Kibet took part at the 2008 London Marathon and finished 11th, but was not well prepared due to injury. He was a late entrant to the 2008 Olympic Marathon, after Robert Kipkoech Cheruiyot pulled out. Kibet did not finish the Olympic race. He finished the otherwise disappointing year by winning Singapore Marathon in December, setting a new course record of 2:13:01.

He began the 2009 season by winning the Lagos Half Marathon on February. He did not finish his next marathon, London Marathon in April 2009, but he successfully defended the Singapore Marathon title, breaking again the course record (new record 2.11.25 minutes).

Personal life 
Kibet is married to Lydia with two children (as of 2008). He currently does most of his training at Moses Tanui's training camp in Kaptagat.

He is not to be confused with another Kenyan marathon runner named Luke Kibet, who is eight years older and won the Country Music Marathon in 2004.

Achievements

References

External links
 
 Marathoninfo profile

1983 births
Living people
People from Uasin Gishu County
Kenyan male long-distance runners
Kenyan male marathon runners
Kenyan male steeplechase runners
Athletes (track and field) at the 2008 Summer Olympics
Olympic athletes of Kenya
World Athletics Championships medalists
World Athletics Championships winners
20th-century Kenyan people
21st-century Kenyan people
Taipei Marathon male winners